Joseph Billings (17581806) was an English navigator, hydrographer and explorer who spent the most significant part of his life in Russian service.

Life

Early life
Joseph Billings was likely born in Yarmouth, the son of a fisherman of the same name. His Russian service record, signed by him, indicates he was born in 1761. He worked on coal ships from an early age and later was apprentice to a watchmaker.

Royal Navy Service
Billings served as able seaman on Captain Cook's final voyage from 1776 to 1780. After the voyage, he was promoted to warrant officer. In 1783 he applied through the Russian ambassador Ivan Matveevich Simolin to enter the Russian navy.

The Billings Expedition

In 1785, the Russian government of Catherine the Great commissioned a new expedition in search for the Northeast Passage, led by Joseph Billings, the Russian officer Gavril Sarychev as his deputy and Carl Heinrich Merck as the expedition's naturalist. Martin Sauer served as secretary and translator. Captains , Gavril Sarychev, and Christian Bering had leading roles. The expedition operated until 1794.

Though considered a failure by some scholars because the expenditures outweighed the results, it nevertheless had a substantial record of achievement. Accurate maps were made of the Chukchi Peninsula in Eastern Siberia, the west coast of Alaska, and the Aleutian Islands. Members of the expedition landed on Kodiak Island and made an examination of the islands and mainlands of Prince William Sound.  Additionally, the expedition compiled a census of the native population of the Aleutian Islands and reported to the crown stories of abuse by the Russian fur traders (promyshlenniki).

Later years
After the expedition, Joseph Billings remained with the Imperial Russian Navy. He was transferred to the Black Sea Fleet at his request. From 1797 to 1798, he conducted a hydrographical survey of the Black Sea. He subsequently published an atlas of this work. In November 1799, he retired and settled in Moscow.

Billings died in Moscow on 18 June 1806, possibly at the age of 48 years.

Legacy
Cape Billings in the Chukotka Autonomous Okrug was named after him.

Billings Glacier on Passage Peak in Alaska was named after him in 1908.

See also
 European and American voyages of scientific exploration

References

External links
Biography at the Dictionary of Canadian Biography Online
Martin SauerAccount of a Geographical and Astronomical Expedition to the Northern Parts of Russia (1802)

1758 births
1806 deaths
English explorers of North America
English hydrographers
Russian America
Explorers from the Russian Empire
Russian people of English descent
Explorers of Alaska
Royal Navy sailors